Stoney Creek, or Stony Creek, is a watercourse in Wayne County, North Carolina, USA, that flows through the city of Goldsboro, North Carolina in its lower course before joining the Neuse River.

Location

Stony Creek is named in local records as early as 1756.
In the Price map of 1808 it is called Rocky Creek.
It is a tributary of the Neuse River.

Land use

The upper part of the Stoney Creek watershed, north of New Hope Road, was mostly agricultural land or undeveloped as of 2004. 
Lower down, about 40% of the watershed is within the Goldsboro city limits and is used for housing, commerce, light industry and military purposes (Seymour Johnson Air Force Base).
Stoney Creek Park is in Goldsboro south of Ash Street on the west side of Stoney Creek.
It has a butterfly garden, a play area for children, an 18-hole disc golf course and a covered picnic area.
Historically development has spread from the lower areas upstream, and in the 2000s there has been growth in commercial and residential land use in the upper basin.

Hydrology

Stoney Creek is in the inner coastal plain of North Carolina, an area with slow streams and large swamp areas.
From upstream to downstream the creek's tributaries are Stoney Run, Howell Creek, Reedy Branch and Billy Branch. 
The upper watershed contains slowly moving blackwater streams, low lying wooded swamps and marsh floodplains.
Often the streams flow through swampy areas.
There are many small dams in the upper watershed made by farmers or beavers.
About 42% of the floodplain is developed, 28% used for agriculture, 23% is forested and 6.1% is wetlands.
The area is prone to flooding.
Waste water is not discharged into the creek.

Notes

Sources

Rivers of Wayne County, North Carolina
Tributaries of the Neuse River
Rivers of North Carolina